Football Club ODEK Orzhiv is a Ukrainian amateur football team from Orzhiv, Rivne Raion. In 2013 the team won the National amateur football championship.

Previously in 1972–1994 Orzhiv was represented by another football team Fakel that before 1983 was known as Derevoobrobnyk. In 2001 the local Orhziv Wood Processing Factory (abbreviated as ODEK) revived its team.

Honours
 Ukrainian football championship among amateurs
 Winner(s) (1): 2013
 Third(s) (5): 2005, 2010 , 2014 , 2015 , 2016 , 
 Ukrainian Amateur Cup
 Runner(s)-up (2): 2003, 2012
 Rivne Oblast championship
 Winner(s) (8): 2002, 2003, 2004, 2006, 2007, 2008, 2011, 2013
 Rivne Oblast cup
 Winner(s) (8): 2001, 2003, 2004, 2006, 2007, 2009, 2010, 2014

Players

Current squad

League and cup history

{|class="wikitable"
|-bgcolor="#efefef"
! Season
! Div.
! Pos.
! Pl.
! W
! D
! L
! GS
! GA
! P
!Amateur Cup
!colspan=2|Europe
!Notes
|-
|align=center|2004
|align=center|4th
|align=center|3
|align=center|8
|align=center|4
|align=center|1
|align=center|3
|align=center|12
|align=center|9
|align=center|13
|align=center|
|align=center|
|align=center|
|align=center|
|-
|align=center rowspan=2|2005
|align=center rowspan=2|4th
|align=center|3
|align=center|10
|align=center|4
|align=center|3
|align=center|3
|align=center|13
|align=center|14
|align=center|15
|align=center rowspan=2|
|align=center rowspan=2|
|align=center rowspan=2|
|align=center|
|-
|align=center bgcolor=tan|3
|align=center|4
|align=center|1
|align=center|1
|align=center|2
|align=center|8
|align=center|9
|align=center|4
|align=center|
|-
|align=center|2006
|align=center colspan=13|did not participate
|-
|align=center|2007
|align=center|4th
|align=center|4
|align=center|8
|align=center|2
|align=center|3
|align=center|3
|align=center|10
|align=center|11
|align=center|9
|align=center|
|align=center|
|align=center|
|align=center|
|-
|align=center rowspan=2|2008
|align=center rowspan=2|4th
|align=center|1
|align=center|8
|align=center|4
|align=center|4
|align=center|0
|align=center|11
|align=center|6
|align=center|16
|align=center rowspan=2|
|align=center rowspan=2|
|align=center rowspan=2|
|align=center|
|-
|align=center|7
|align=center|3
|align=center|0
|align=center|1
|align=center|2
|align=center|3
|align=center|7
|align=center|1
|align=center|
|-
|align=center|2009
|align=center|4th
|align=center|3
|align=center|6
|align=center|1
|align=center|2
|align=center|3
|align=center|5
|align=center|8
|align=center|5
|align=center|
|align=center|
|align=center|
|align=center|
|-
|align=center rowspan=2|2010
|align=center rowspan=2|4th
|align=center|3
|align=center|8
|align=center|4
|align=center|2
|align=center|2
|align=center|14
|align=center|11
|align=center|14
|align=center rowspan=2|
|align=center rowspan=2|
|align=center rowspan=2|
|align=center|
|-
|align=center bgcolor=tan|3/4
|align=center|2
|align=center|1
|align=center|1
|align=center|0
|align=center|5
|align=center|2
|align=center|4
|align=center|
|-
|align=center rowspan=2|2011
|align=center rowspan=2|4th
|align=center|3
|align=center|13
|align=center|7
|align=center|2
|align=center|4
|align=center|27
|align=center|14
|align=center|23
|align=center rowspan=2|
|align=center rowspan=2|
|align=center rowspan=2|
|align=center|
|-
|align=center|5/6
|align=center|3
|align=center|0
|align=center|2
|align=center|1
|align=center|3
|align=center|6
|align=center|2
|align=center|
|-
|align=center rowspan=2|2012
|align=center rowspan=2|4th
|align=center|1
|align=center|10
|align=center|9
|align=center|0
|align=center|1
|align=center|20
|align=center|5
|align=center|27
|align=center rowspan=2|
|align=center rowspan=2|
|align=center rowspan=2|
|align=center|
|-
|align=center|5/6
|align=center|3
|align=center|1
|align=center|0
|align=center|2
|align=center|3
|align=center|3
|align=center|3
|align=center|
|-
|align=center rowspan=2|2013
|align=center rowspan=2|4th
|align=center|2
|align=center|10
|align=center|7
|align=center|1
|align=center|2
|align=center|15
|align=center|10
|align=center|22
|align=center rowspan=2|
|align=center rowspan=2|
|align=center rowspan=2|
|align=center|
|-
|align=center bgcolor=gold|1
|align=center|4
|align=center|2
|align=center|1
|align=center|1
|align=center|6
|align=center|2
|align=center|7
|align=center|
|-
|align=center rowspan=2|2014
|align=center rowspan=2|4th
|align=center|2
|align=center|8
|align=center|4
|align=center|2
|align=center|2
|align=center|13
|align=center|9
|align=center|14
|align=center rowspan=2|
|align=center rowspan=2|
|align=center rowspan=2|
|align=center|
|-
|align=center bgcolor=tan|3/4
|align=center|3
|align=center|2
|align=center|0
|align=center|1
|align=center|4
|align=center|1
|align=center|6
|align=center|
|-
|align=center rowspan=3|2015
|align=center rowspan=3|4th
|align=center|3
|align=center|6
|align=center|2
|align=center|2
|align=center|2
|align=center|7
|align=center|6
|align=center|8
|align=center rowspan=3|
|align=center rowspan=3|
|align=center rowspan=3|
|align=center|
|-
|align=center|5
|align=center|10
|align=center|2
|align=center|4
|align=center|4
|align=center|10
|align=center|17
|align=center|10
|align=center|
|-
|align=center bgcolor=tan|3/4
|align=center|3
|align=center|1
|align=center|1
|align=center|1
|align=center|2
|align=center|1
|align=center|4
|align=center|
|-
|align=center|2016
|align=center|4th
|align=center bgcolor=gold|1
|align=center|6
|align=center|5
|align=center|1
|align=center|0
|align=center|18
|align=center|1
|align=center|16
|align=center|
|align=center|AL
|align=center bgcolor=tan|
|align=center|
|-
|align=center|2016–17
|align=center|4th
|align=center|4
|align=center|20
|align=center|12
|align=center|1
|align=center|7
|align=center|34
|align=center|18
|align=center|37
|align=center|
|align=center|
|align=center|
|align=center|
|-
|align=center|2017–18
|align=center|4th
|align=center|
|align=center|
|align=center|
|align=center|
|align=center|
|align=center|
|align=center|
|align=center|
|align=center|
|align=center|
|align=center|
|align=center|
|}

References

External links
 Official website (archived)
 ODEK Orzhiv at AAFU
 FC ODEK Orzhiv. Rivne Oblast Football Federation.
 Amateurs, to the start line! (Аматори, на старт!). Football.ua. 29 April 2015

 
ODEK Orzhiv, FC
Association football clubs established in 2001
2001 establishments in Ukraine
ODEK Orzhiv
Rivne Raion